The Zambia national rugby sevens team is the men's african rugby sevens team that competes in the annual Africa Men's Sevens competition and the Commonwealth Games. It is governed by the Zambia Rugby Football Union (ZRFU).

History
Zambia made their first Commonwealth Games rugby sevens appearance in 2018, and they qualified again in 2022. Their best result at the Africa sevens event was fourth (2017, 2022).

The squad competed in 2 events in 2022 - the Zambezi Challenge 7s coming as runners up, notably higher then both Botswana (8th) and Zimbabwe (3rd). They finished 4th in the 2022 Africa 7s held in Kampala, Uganada. They were very close to qualifiying for the World Cup that year, losing to Zimbabwe by 7 points in the Semi-Final and to Kenya by 5 points in the Bronze Final.

Players 
Zambia's sevens squad to the 2022 Commonwealth Games.
Head coach: Musonda Kaminsa

Team records

Rugby World Cup Sevens

Commonwealth Games

References

   
 

National rugby sevens teams
Rugby union in Zambia